is a Japanese word which literally means "first love". It may refer to:

Books
Hatsukoi Gentei, the Japanese title of First Love Limited, a 2007-2008 manga series by Mizuki Kawashita
Hatsukoi Scandal, a 1981-1986 manga series by Akira Oze
Hatsukoi Shimai, the Japanese title of First Love Sisters, a 2003-2008 manga series by Mako Komao

Film and TV
Hatsukoi, 1926 Japanese film, directed by Heinosuke Gosho
Hatsukoi, 1939 Japanese film, directed by Tomoyoshi Murayama
Hatsukoi Jigokuhen, a 1968 film directed by Susumu Hani 
Hatsukoi, 1975 Japanese film, with Akiko Nishina Turgenev
Hatsukoi, 2000 Japanese film, with Rena Tanaka
Hatsukoi, 2006 Japanese film, with Aoi Miyazaki based on novel by :ja:中原みすず
Hatsukoi, 初恋 夏の記憶  2009 Japanese film Hanako (actress) Turgenev
Hatsukoi, (はつ恋), 2012 NHK drama series, with Yoshino Kimura
Hatsukoi (初恋), 2019 film directed by Takashi Miike

Music
Hatsukoi (Kōzō Murashita album) 1983
Hatsukoi (Space Streakings album) Space Streakings
"Hatsukoi", song by Kōzō Murashita 1983
 "Hatsukoi", a 1997 song by Mayumi Kojima
Hatsukoi (Hitomi Yaida single), a 2006 single release from Japanese artist Hitomi Yaida
Hatsukoi (Masaharu Fukuyama song), a 2009 single by Japanese artist Masaharu Fukuyama
Hatsukoi (Yuki Saito song), a 1985 single by Japanese artist Yuki Saito
Hatsukoi Cider, the title song on the 2012 single Hatsukoi Cider / Deep Mind from Japanese group Buono!
"Hatsukoi", song by Hanako Oku
"Hatsukoi", song by Aiko (singer)
Hatsukoi (Hikaru Utada album) 2018
 "Hatsukoi" (Hikaru Utada song), the title song